Rausch is a German surname.  Notable people with the name include:

 Barb Rausch (1941–2001), American comics artist and writer
 David A. Rausch, American writer and journalist
 Eberhard Rausch (born 1947), German skater
 Emil Rausch (1883–1954), German freestyle swimmer
 Friedel Rausch (1940–2017), German football player and manager
 James Steven Rausch (1928–1981), American Roman Catholic bishop
 Konstantin Rausch (1990–), Russian footballer
 Leon Rausch (1927–2019), American singer
 Lotte Rausch (1913–1995), German actress
 Robert L. Rausch (1921–2012), American parasitologist, mammalogist, and veterinary physician
 Thomas Rausch, American theologian
 Wolfgang Rausch (born 1947), German footballer

See also
 Rausch Creek (disambiguation)
 Raush (disambiguation)
 Roush, a surname
 Intoxication, a 1919 film with German-language title Rausch

German-language surnames